German submarine U-547 was a Type IXC U-boat of Nazi Germany's Kriegsmarine during World War II.

She was laid down at the Deutsche Werft (yard) in Hamburg as yard number 368 on 30 August 1942, launched on 3 April 1943 and commissioned on 16 June with Korvettenkapitän Kurt Sturm in command.

U-547 began her service career with training as part of the 4th U-boat Flotilla from 16 June 1943. She was reassigned to the 2nd flotilla for operations on 1 January 1944, then the 33rd flotilla on 1 October.

She carried out three patrols and sank three ships; two of them totalled . She was a member of four wolfpacks.

She was damaged by a mine in France on 11 August 1944 and possibly scuttled at Stettin (now Szczecin, Poland) on 31 December 1944.

Design
German Type IXC/40 submarines were slightly larger than the original Type IXCs. U-547 had a displacement of  when at the surface and  while submerged. She had two shafts and two  propellers.

U-547 was fitted with six  torpedo tubes (four fitted at the bow and two at the stern), 22 torpedoes, one  SK C/32 naval gun, 180 rounds, and a  SK C/30 as well as a  C/30 anti-aircraft gun. The boat had a complement of forty-eight.

Service history

First patrol
U-547s first patrol began with her departure from Kiel on 25 December 1943. She passed through the gap separating Iceland and the Faroe Islands before heading out into the Atlantic Ocean.

She entered Lorient, on the French Atlantic coast, on 23 February 1944.

Second patrol
For her second foray, the boat headed for the west African coast. There, she sank the French ship Saint Basile off Liberia on 14 June 1944.

The survivors were questioned, the master was taken prisoner.

She returned to France on 11 August 1944, but this time to Bordeaux.

Third patrol and fate
U-547 was damaged by a mine on 11 August 1944 in the Gironde (where the mouths of the Garonne and Dordogne rivers merge), near Pauillac in western France; she then retraced part of the route of her first patrol, arriving at Marviken in Kristiansand on 29 September and moving on to Flensburg on 4 October. She was taken out of service and possibly scuttled in Stettin (now Szczecin, Poland) on 31 December 1944.

Summary of raiding history

References

Notes

Citations

Bibliography

External links

German Type IX submarines
U-boats commissioned in 1943
U-boats sunk in 1944
World War II submarines of Germany
1943 ships
Ships built in Hamburg